The following is a list of notable lawsuits involving former United States president Donald Trump. The list excludes cases that only name Trump as a legal formality in his capacity as president, such as habeas corpus requests.

Trump as plaintiff 

The lawsuit against Mary Trump is in its infancy, while the lawsuit against The Washington Post is reaching two years of age.

Lawsuits around Trump's financial and tax information 

Trump et al. v. Mazars et al.The U.S. House of Representatives had subpoenaed the Mazars accounting firm to provide Trump's tax returns. Trump appealed to keep his financial information private. In July 2020, the U.S. Supreme Court decided 7–2 to send the case back to evaluate the worthiness of the subpoena request. The case was not resolved before the 2020 elections. The Congressional subpoenas related to these cases expired with the end of the 116th Congress on January 3, 2021 and were reissued in the 117th Congress on February 23, 2021.
Trump et al. v. Deutsche Bank et al.Appeal lawsuit against the Deutsche Bank and Capital One Bank, seeking to prevent them from complying with the subpoenas issued to the company for Trump's, his adult children's, and his businesses' financial records. The subpoenas had been issued by the House Financial Services and Intelligence committees. The Supreme Court consolidated the case with Trump v. Mazars.
Trump v. VanceIn July 2020, the U.S. Supreme Court ruled 7–2 that the State of New York could issue a grand-jury subpoena of the President's financial records. The request was determined not to violate Article II or the Supremacy Clause of the United States Constitution. After the court's ruling, Trump's team filed two legal complaints, both of which were rejected.
Donald J. Trump v. Committee on Ways and Means, et al.Case in D.C. court challenging the New York TRUST Act, which gives Congress the right to obtain tax information on New York residents. Case dismissed on November 11, 2019.
 Donald J. Trump v. Mary L. Trump, et al.On September 22, 2021, Trump commenced a lawsuit in New York state court against The New York Times, several journalists and his niece, Mary L. Trump, for a 2018 article detailing his taxes and finances, which he claims violates a 2001 settlement agreement signed by Mary. Trump is seeking at least $100 million in damages.
Donald J. Trump and Trump Organization, LLC v. Letitia James in her official capacity as Attorney General for the State of New YorkOn December 20, 2021, this complaint for declaratory and injunctive relief was filed in federal court against New York Attorney General Letitia James. It accuses James of misconduct, by claiming that her involvement in the investigations into Trump and his corporation was motivated by a desire to target a political adversary and advance her career.

Lawsuits around the United States Census 
Trump v. New YorkOn September 22, 2020, Trump sought an emergency action from the Supreme Court to rule on the matter before the results of the Census were due by December 31, 2020. On December 18, 2020, the Supreme Court dismissed the case.
Trump v. UsecheOn November 13, 2020, Trump sought an emergency action from the Supreme Court to rule on the matter before the results of the Census were due by December 31, 2020. On December 28, 2020, the Supreme Court ruled the case should be dismissed for lack of jurisdiction.

Lawsuits filed by the Trump campaign 

Donald J. Trump for President, Inc. v. Northland Television, LLC – Lawsuit brought by the Trump campaign against a Wisconsin TV station for airing an advertisement criticizing the U.S. federal government response to the COVID-19 pandemic. Dismissed in federal court after the election for lack of standing.
Donald J. Trump for President, Inc. v. WP Company LLC d/b/a Washington Post Dismissed in February 2023.
Donald J. Trump for President, Inc. v. CNNCase dismissed in November 2020.
 Donald J. Trump for President, Inc. v. New York Times – The suit alleged that an op-ed piece in the Times titled "The Real Trump-Russia Quid Pro Quo" was defamatory. The case was dismissed in March 2021.
 Donald J. Trump for President, Inc. v. Bucks County Bd. of Elections – Pennsylvania Supreme Court ruled in favor of Defendants.
 Donald J. Trump for President, Inc. v. Toulouse Oliver – Dismissed on February 2, 2021, in the United States District Court for the District of New Mexico.
 Donald J. Trump for President, Inc. v. Bullock – The United States District Court for the District of Montana ruled against the Trump campaign, reasoning that the threat of "widespread voter fraud... is a fiction."

Trump's racketeering lawsuit against Hillary Clinton, the DNC, and others 

In March  2022, Trump filed a RICO lawsuit against Hillary Clinton, the Democratic National Committee, and dozens of Democrats, "alleging that they 'maliciously conspired to weave a false narrative that [Trump] was colluding with a hostile foreign sovereignty [Russia]' to try and rig the 2016 election." He demanded a jury trial and compensatory damages of at least $24 million.  In September, US District Judge Donald M. Middlebrooks dismissed the suit, stating that it "ignored existing laws, U.S, Supreme Court precedent, and basic legal theory." The judge also wrote in a footnote that Trump had the lawsuit filed in the federal courthouse in Fort Pierce, Florida, which has only one federal judge, district judge Aileen Cannon, a Trump appointee.

Trump appealed the decision on October 11.

On November 2, Clinton and the other defendants filed a motion in the district court asking for sanctions against Trump's attorneys and to make Trump pay their legal bills of more than $1 million. In January 2023, the judge ordered Trump to pay nearly $1 million in penalties, describing the case as "a lawsuit that should never have been filed, which was completely frivolous, both factually and legally, and which was brought in bad faith for an improper purpose".

Lawsuits around the January 6, 2021, attack 

 Trump v. Thompson, the United States House Select Committee to Investigate the January 6 Attack on the United States Capitol et al.On October 18, 2021, Trump sued to block the release of White House records related to the January 6, 2021, riot. The lawsuit claimed that the House committee was illegitimate and that its request for the records was a partisan sham. On January 19, 2022, the Supreme Court denied Trump's request without providing a reason. The next day, the National Archives and Records Administration released the White House documents to the committee.
 Trump v. the United States House Select Committee to Investigate the January 6 Attack on the United States Capitol et al.On November 11, 2022, Trump sued the January 6 Committee to block a subpoena to testify before the committee.

Trump as defendant

Lawsuits around the United States Constitution 
Lawsuits alleging violations of the First Amendment to the U.S. Constitution
Knight First Amendment Institute v. Trump
CNN v. Trump
U.S. WeChat Users Alliance v. Trump
Lawsuits alleging violations of the Fifth Amendment to the U.S. Constitution
Department of Homeland Security v. Regents of the University of California (the DACA lawsuit)
New York v. Trump (another DACA lawsuit)
Vidal v. Nielsen (another DACA lawsuit)
Lawsuit alleging violations of the Fourteenth Amendment to the U.S. Constitution
Stone v. Trump
Lawsuits alleging violations of the Foreign Emoluments Clause of the United States Constitution
CREW v. Trump
D.C. and Maryland v. Trump
Blumenthal v. Trump
 U.S. Constitutional case law lawsuit filed by the United States House Committee on the Judiciary to compel the testimony of former White House Counsel Donald F. McGahn, Jr. under subpoena.
In re: Don McGahn

Lawsuits around executive orders and presidential proclamations and memorandums 
Legal challenges to Executive Order 13768, regarding sanctuary cities
City and County of San Francisco v. Trump
City of Chelsea v. Trump
Legal challenges to Executive Order 13769, regarding temporary immigration restrictions
Aziz v. Trump
Darweesh v. Trump
Doe v. Trump
Louhghalam v. Trump
Mohammed v. United States
Sarsour v. Trump
Washington v. Trump
 Legal challenges to Executive Order 13780, a revised order on temporary immigration restrictions
Hawaii v. Trump
International Refugee Assistance Project v. Trump
Washington v. Trump
Legal challenges to Temporary Protected Status changes
Bhattarai v. Nielsen
Ramos v. Nielsen
 Legal challenge to Presidential Proclamation "Addressing Mass Migration Through the Southern Border of the United States" ("Proclamation") 83 Fed. Reg. 57,661, which expressly invokes 
East Bay Sanctuary Covenant v. Trump
 Lawsuits around TikTok
 TikTok v. Trump
 Lawsuits regarding Presidential Memorandum on Military Service by Transgender Individuals by Donald Trump (August 25, 2017)
Jane Doe v. Trump
Stone v. Trump
Karnoski v. Trump
Stockman v. Trump

Lawsuits around legal violations 

Lawsuit alleging violations of compliance with a grand jury empaneled by Robert Mueller in the Special counsel investigation
In re Grand Jury Subpoena
Lawsuit alleging violations of the Presidential Records Act of 1978, 
CREW and National Security Archive v. Trump and EOP
 Lawsuits challenging Presidential Advisory Commission on Election Integrity alleging violations of the Federal Advisory Committee Act
ACLU v. Trump and Pence
Joyner v. Presidential Advisory Commission on Election Integrity
NAACP v. Trump
 Lawsuit alleging violation of 12 U.S.C. § 5491(b)(5)(B), a component of the Dodd–Frank Act of 2010
English v. Trump
Lawsuit requesting grand jury materials from the Special counsel investigation by Robert Mueller
In re Application of the Committee on the Judiciary
New York state lawsuit against the Trump administration for its policy to exclude New Yorkers from enrolling in federal Trusted Traveler programs.
Lawsuit alleging Freedom of Information Act violations regarding redaction of The Room Where It Happened by John Bolton
Legal Eagle, LLC v. National Security Council Records Access and Information Security Management Directorate
Lawsuit alleging "retaliatory imprisonment" in reaction to Disloyal by Michael Cohen
Cohen v U.S., 21-cv-10774, U.S. District Court, Southern District of New York (Manhattan)
 Lawsuit around the FBI investigation into Donald Trump's handling of government documents
 Donald J. Trump v. United States of America (2022, dismissed)

Lawsuits around the United States Census 
Regarding the 2020 United States Census
Department of Commerce v. New York
New York Immigration Coalition v. United States Department of Commerce

Lawsuits around Trump political campaigns 
 Lawsuit alleging that the Trump Campaign used mass, unsolicited communication of promotional messages that the plaintiffs did not consent to receive
Thorne v. Donald J Trump for President Inc.
Lawsuit alleging Russian interference in the 2016 Federal Elections, the Trump campaign was accused of engaging in a racketeering enterprise in conjunction with Russia and WikiLeaks
Democratic National Committee v. Russian Federation (dismissed)
 Lawsuit regarding a pattern of persistent illegal conduct, occurring over more than a decade, that includes extensive unlawful political coordination with the Trump presidential campaign, repeated and willful self-dealing transactions to benefit Mr. Trump's personal and business interests, and violations of basic legal obligations for non-profit foundations
State of New York v. The Trump Foundation
 Lawsuit in which plaintiffs alleged Trump's security team assaulted them during a 2015 peaceful protest based around Trump's campaign comments about Black Lives Matter and Mexican immigrants
Galicia v. Trump
Lawsuit alleging Trump encouraged an atmosphere of violence and anti-Trump protesters were subjected to attacks and racial slurs being led out of a campaign rally in 2016
Nwanguma v. Trump
Lawsuit alleging that Trump and the Republican National Committee colluded to prevent any competition to Trump's re-election campaign.
Roque De La Fuente v. Trump & Republican National Committee 
 Roger Stone (Roger J. Stone Jr.) found guilty by a jury in November 2019 of on  obstruction of a congressional investigation, five counts of making false statements to Congress, and tampering with a witness in the United States District Court for the District of Columbia. He was later sentenced to 40 months in prison.
Lawsuit alleging that Trump infringed copyright by tweeting a campaign video that included musician Eddy Grant's song “Electric Avenue"

Lawsuits around sexual misconduct and assault 

 Lawsuit by Katie Johnson which alleges that Trump and Jeffrey Epstein sexually and physically abused her under threats to physically harm her and her family while a 13-year-old minor from June–September 1994
Katie Johnson v. Donald J Trump and Jeffrey E Epstein (dismissed)
Lawsuit by Jane Doe which alleges Trump and Epstein engaged in forcible rape, imprisonment and assault while she was 13-year-old minor and another 12-year-old girl in 1994
Jane Doe v. Donald Trump & Jeffrey E Epstein (dismissed by Doe)
Lawsuit by former campaign staffer, Alva Johnson, who claims that Trump forcibly kissed her at a rally in Florida in August 2016. The lawsuit also alleges unequal pay standards for her, an African-American woman, compared to others on the team
Johnson v. Trump
 Defamation lawsuit raised by Summer Zervos which arose from Trump's statement that she lied about sexual assault allegations against him
Zervos v. Trump
 Defamation and battery litigation on behalf of E. Jean Carroll, who alleges that Trump sexually assaulted her in the mid-1990s and that his denials of her accusation harmed her professionally
Carroll v. Trump

Lawsuits around financial manipulation and employee payment 

 Lawsuit alleging violations of employee payment regarding not paying him for "thousands of hours of overtime" to which he was legally entitled during his more than two decades of service
Cintron v. Trump Organization
Lawsuit alleging that Trump and his adult children had made a large amount of money by encouraging unsophisticated investors to join fraudulent schemes
Doe et al. v. Trump Corp. et al.
Lawsuit by the New York AG alleging that Trump, the Trump Organization and his three adult children engaged in numerous acts of fraud and misrepresentations to inflate his net worth to lenders
People of the State of New York, by Letitia James v. Donald J Trump et al

Lawsuits around environmental concerns 

Lawsuit brought by Our Children's Trust using the public trust doctrine to address the effects of global warming. Settlement is being discussed.
Juliana v. United States
League of Conservation Voters lawsuit challenging Trump's attempt to undo a ban on oil and gas drilling in certain areas of the Atlantic and Arctic Oceans. District court ruled that Trump overstepped his constitutional authority and violated federal law. Ninth Circuit ruled President Biden’s revocation of President Trump’s executive order rendered the case moot. 
League of Conservation Voters v. Trump

Lawsuits around COVID-19 

Lawsuit brought against Trump's alleged denial of stimulus checks to spouses of undocumented immigrants
John Doe v. Trump

Lawsuits around 2020 election fraud claims 

Trump and his team filed dozens of lawsuits regarding the procedures in the 2020 presidential election and Joe Biden's victory. Georgia Cobb County and DeKalb County filed lawsuits to recover costs associated with what DeKalb County called "unsubstantiated and frivolous claims."

In November 2020, the Michigan Welfare Rights Organization along with three black voters filed a lawsuit against Donald Trump and his presidential campaign for allegedly disenfranchising black voters in Michigan. The following month, the NAACP filed an amendment complaint, this time adding the Republican National Committee as an defendant, in which the civil rights organization accused Trump, his presidential campaign and the RNC of coordinated conspiracy to disenfranchise hundreds of thousands of voters in targeted cities with large black populations, such as Atlanta, Milwaukee and Philadelphia.

In February 2021, U.S. Representative Bennie Thompson filed a lawsuit against Donald Trump, Rudy Giuliani, the Proud Boys and the Oath Keepers for conspiring to attack the Capitol. In February 2022, a federal judge ruled that the lawsuit could proceed.

In March 2021, U.S. Representative Eric Swalwell filed a lawsuit against Donald Trump, Donald Trump Jr., Rudy Giuliani and U.S. Representative Mo Brooks (R-AL) for their actions on the day the U.S. Capitol was stormed. In February 2022, a federal judge ruled that the lawsuit could proceed.

In March 2021, two Capitol Police officers filed a lawsuit against Donald Trump. In February 2022, a federal judge ruled that the lawsuit could proceed.

In January 2022, two Metropolitan and one Capitol Police officer filed separate suits against Trump, highlighting alleged wrongful conduct by Trump in inciting a riot during the January 6 riot.

In November 2021, James Savage, a voting machine warehouse custodian in Delaware County, filed a 60-page defamation lawsuit against Donald Trump, Rudy Giuliani, and Jenna Ellis.

All current pending prosecution 
Special Counsel Jack Smith is currently investigating two cases involving Trump. The first is the investigation, as described in court filings in the District of Columbia, into whether any person or entity unlawfully interfered with the transfer of power following the 2020 presidential election or the certification of the Electoral College vote held on or about January 6, 2021. The second is the ongoing investigation involving classified documents and other presidential records, as well as the possible obstruction of that investigation, referenced and described in court filings submitted in a pending matter in the Southern District of Florida.

Doe et al. v. Trump Corp. et al., a lawsuit alleging racketeering by Trump and some of his adult children through various Trump-associated organizations.

Trump 2020 campaign-related lawsuits by state

Arizona 
 Donald J. Trump for President v. Katie Hobbs

New Jersey 
 Donald J. Trump for President v. Way

Pennsylvania 
 Republican Party of Pennsylvania v. Boockvar, 20-542; Scarnati v. Pennsylvania Democratic Party, 20-574
 Donald J. Trump for President, Inc. v. Kathy Boockvar and County Boards of Elections, 602 MD 2020
 Philadelphia County Canvassing Observation Appeal, 1094 CD 20
 Donald J. Trump for President, Inc. v. Philadelphia County Board of Elections, 20-5533
 Hamm, Kelly, Allred, Horner, Connor and Hauser v. Boockvar, 600 MD 2020
 Donald J. Trump for President, Inc., et al. v. Kathy Boockvar, et al., 4:20-cv-02078

Michigan 
 Donald J. Trump and Eric Ostergren v. Jocelyn Benson, 20-000225-MZ

Georgia 
 In Re: Enforcement of Election Laws and Securing Ballots Cast or Received after 7:00pm on November 3, 2020, SPCV20-00982
 Trump v. Kemp

Wisconsin 
 Pierson v. Stepien, 20-CV-9266

See also 
Business projects of Donald Trump in Russia
Legal affairs of Donald Trump
Links between Trump associates and Russian officials
Republican reactions to Donald Trump's claims of 2020 election fraud
Timeline of investigations into Donald Trump and Russia (2019)
Timeline of investigations into Donald Trump and Russia (2020–2021)

References

Presidency of Donald Trump

Donald Trump
Donald Trump-related lists
Donald Trump controversies
Trump administration controversies